Narón Balompé Piñeiros is a Spanish football team based in Narón, in the autonomous community of Galicia. Founded in 1996 it currently plays in Tercera División – Group 1, holding home games at Estadio Río Seco, which has a capacity of 1,000 spectators.

History
Narón was founded in 1996 after a merger of the two most important teams in the city, Unión Deportiva Piñeiros (1963–96) and Fútbol Sala Narón (1985–96). It first reached the fourth division in 2003–04.

Narón spent eight consecutive seasons in the fourth category before being relegated in 2011. It competed in the promotion playoffs in 2007–08, being ousted by Antequera CF in the first round (1–4 on aggregate).

Season to season

8 seasons in Tercera División
8 seasons in Categorías Regionales

Famous players
Note: this list contains players that have played at least 100 league games and/or have reached international status.
 Ángel Cuéllar

External links
Official website 
Futbolme team profile 

Football clubs in Galicia (Spain)
Association football clubs established in 1996
1996 establishments in Spain